Bhaichung Bhutia Stadium is a football stadium in Namchi, the district headquarters of South Sikkim district in the state of Sikkim, India. The stadium was built in honour of Bhaichung Bhutia, one of India's most known contemporary footballers.

References

Football venues in Sikkim
Namchi district
Sports venues in Sikkim
2011 establishments in Sikkim
Sports venues completed in 2011